7th Division may refer to:

Infantry units
 7th Division (Australia)
 7th Infantry Division (Bangladesh)
 7th Canadian Infantry Division
 7th Division (Continuation War)
 7th Division (Winter War)
 7th Infantry Division (France), an infantry division in World War II
 7th Division (German Empire)
 7th Division (Reichswehr), 
 7th Infantry Division (Wehrmacht), a German unit during World War II
 7th Mountain Division (Wehrmacht), a German unit during World War II
 7th SS Volunteer Mountain Division Prinz Eugen, Nazi Germany
 7th Infantry Division (Greece)
 7th (Meerut) Division, of the British Indian Army before and during World War I
 7th Meerut Divisional Area, of the British Indian Army during World War I
 7th Indian Infantry Division, of the British Indian Army during World War II
 7th Division (Iraq)
 7th Infantry Division Lupi di Toscana, Kingdom of Italy
 7th_Division (Imperial Japanese Army)
 7th Division (Japan), of the Japan Ground Self-Defense Force
 7th Division (North Korea)
 7th Infantry Division (Pakistan)
 7th Infantry Division (Philippines)
 7th Infantry Division (Poland)
 7th Infantry Division (Russian Empire)
 7th Infantry Division (South Korea)
 7th Division (South Vietnam)
 7th Infantry Division (Syria)
 7th Infantry Division (Thailand)
 7th Ukrainian Soviet Division
 7th Infantry Division (United Kingdom)
 7th Infantry Division (United States)
 7th Infantry Division (Vietnam)

Cavalry units
 7th Cavalry Division (German Empire)
 7th Cavalry Division (Russian Empire)

Armoured units
 7th Armoured Division (France)
 7th Panzer Division (Wehrmacht), a German unit during World War II
 7th Panzer Division (Bundeswehr), Germany
 7th Armoured Division (United Kingdom)
 7th Armored Division (United States)

Other units
 7th Armed Police Mobile Division, China
 7th Air Division (Germany), a German unit during World War II
 7th Air Division (Japan), of the Imperial Japanese Army
 7th Anti-Aircraft Division (United Kingdom)
 7th Air Division, United States

See also 
 7th Brigade (disambiguation)